Pseudonemophas is a genus of longhorn beetles of the subfamily Lamiinae, containing the following species:

 Pseudonemophas baluanus (Aurivillius, 1923)
 Pseudonemophas versteegi (Ritsema, 1881)

References

Lamiini
Beetle genera